The 1992 British Grand Prix was a Formula One motor race held on 12 July 1992 at Silverstone, Northamptonshire. It was the ninth round of the 1992 Formula One World Championship. The 59-lap race was won by Nigel Mansell for the Williams-Renault team, the Englishman also starting from pole position, leading every lap and setting the fastest lap of the race. Riccardo Patrese finished second in the other Williams car, with Martin Brundle third in a Benetton-Ford.

After Mansell won his home Grand Prix, the British spectators invaded the race track to congratulate their hero. Mansell's car was blocked by the crowd, preventing him from driving back to the pits. Eventually Mansell was returned to the pits by track marshals to attend the podium ceremony. The win was the 28th of Mansell's career, thus making him the most successful British Formula One driver of all time in terms of wins (surpassing Jackie Stewart's 27).

Future World Champion Damon Hill made his first start, for the Brabham team. Two further future champions, Michael Schumacher and Mika Häkkinen, scored points.

Qualifying

Pre-qualifying report
The Friday morning pre-qualifying pool was slightly changed at this Grand Prix, the mid-point of the season. Footwork driver Michele Alboreto was relieved of the necessity to pre-qualify, and was replaced in the pool by Gabriele Tarquini of Fondmetal. Thus both Fondmetal drivers were now required to pre-qualify, alongside the two Larrousse drivers and the two Andrea Moda drivers.

The session itself followed the usual pattern for this season, with the two Andrea Moda cars being the ones to drop out at this stage. Bertrand Gachot was comfortably fastest for Larrousse, with Tarquini over 2.7 seconds slower in second. Gachot's team-mate Ukyo Katayama was third, 1.4 seconds ahead of the final pre-qualifier, Andrea Chiesa, who was using the older Fondmetal GR01 after driving, and writing off, the new GR02 at the last race.

The Andrea Moda team had arrived at the circuit, unlike the previous event in France, and had engines with them, unlike the prior event in Canada. With the first part of the session taking place in damp conditions, Perry McCarthy was held in the pits by his team until the track was almost dry. However, he was then sent out with his team-mate Roberto Moreno's used wet tyres on his car, and managed only one timed lap before his clutch failed. Despite McCarthy setting a time fast enough to pre-qualify at that stage, all the other entrants subsequently took advantage of the drying track and went much faster. However, Moreno was still unable to match Chiesa's time, finishing fifth in the session, over 1.6 seconds slower than the Fondmetal.

Pre-qualifying classification

Qualifying report
Nigel Mansell dominated qualifying, taking his eighth pole position of the year by nearly two seconds from Williams teammate Riccardo Patrese with a further 0.8 seconds back to Ayrton Senna's McLaren in third. Alongside Senna on the second row was Michael Schumacher in the Benetton, with their respective teammates Gerhard Berger and Martin Brundle on the third row. Johnny Herbert was seventh in his Lotus, ahead of Jean Alesi's Ferrari, with Mika Häkkinen in the other Lotus and Érik Comas in the Ligier completing the top ten. Damon Hill qualified for the first time, taking the 26th and last slot in his Brabham.

Qualifying classification

Race

Race report
Though Patrese led at the first corner, Mansell soon re-passed his teammate and pulled away from the rest of the field, eventually winning by 39 seconds. Johnny Herbert became the first of the leaders to retire from 6th position in the leading Lotus by the pit wall with transmission problems on lap 32. Jean Alesi in the leading Ferrari eventually went off the track with mechanical problems by lap 44. Brundle made a fast start to run third, battling with his old Formula 3 rival Senna until the Brazilian suffered a transmission failure seven laps from the end. Brundle eventually finished nine seconds behind Patrese and five ahead of teammate Schumacher, who had lost time following a collision with the Jordan of Stefano Modena when he was trying to lap him. Berger finished fifth, right behind Schumacher despite an engine problem in the closing stages, while Häkkinen took the final point for sixth. Hill finished 16th, four laps behind Mansell; he and other drivers were still circulating when the spectators invaded the track to celebrate Mansell's win.

The win, Mansell's seventh of the season, moved him to 76 points in the Drivers' Championship, with Patrese on 40 and Schumacher on 29. In the Constructors' Championship, Williams had 116 points, with Benetton a distant second on 42 and McLaren on 38.

Race classification

Championship standings after the race

Drivers' Championship standings

Constructors' Championship standings

 Note: Only the top five positions are included for both sets of standings.

References

External links

British Grand Prix
British Grand Prix
Grand Prix
British Grand Prix